Uzbekistan participated in the 2011 Asian Winter Games in Almaty and Astana, Kazakhstan from January 30, 2011 to February 6, 2011.

Alpine skiing

Uzbekistan sent 4 alpine skiers.

Men

Women

Biathlon

Uzbekistan sent 2 Biathletes. 
Men

Figure skating
 
Men

Women

References

Nations at the 2011 Asian Winter Games
Asian Winter Games
Uzbekistan at the Asian Winter Games